Knockout at the Breakfast Club (Swedish: Stjärnsmäll i Frukostklubben) is a 1950 Swedish comedy film directed by Gösta Bernhard and starring Sigge Fürst, Åke Söderblom and Irene Söderblom. It was shot at the Centrumateljéerna Studios in Stockholm. The film's sets were designed by the art director Bibi Lindström. It was based on a popular radio series.

Synopsis
A young screenwriter is trying to sell a script about a crime film to a director, but a series of mix-ups ensue including the involvement of an irate ex-boxer who jealously believes his wife is having an affair.

Cast
 Sigge Fürst as Sigge Fürst
 Åke Söderblom as 	'Trollet' Svensson
 Sven Lindberg as 	Gunnar
 Douglas Håge as	Dir. Toning
 Irene Söderblom as 	Greta 
 Gus Dahlström as 	Gus
 Holger Höglund as 	Holger
 Marianne Löfgren as 	Tilda
 Arne Källerud as Bergström
 Nils Olsson as 	Fix I 
 Carl-Gustaf Lindstedt as Fix II 
 Gunnar 'Knas' Lindkvist as Fix III 
 Georg Adelly as 	Jojje
 Inga Hodell as 	Gullan
 Sven Arefeldt as 	Sven
 Andrew Walter as 	Dragspelare
 Curt Randelli as	Kaffepetter 
 Harriet Andersson as 	En flicka
 Frithiof Bjärne as 	Lejon 
 Ingrid Björk as 	Medlem av revybaletten 
 Carl-Axel Elfving as 	Skulptör 
 Siegfried Fischer as 	Efraim Larsson 
 Gita Gordeladze as 	Sekreterare 
 Haide Göransson as Vårflicka 
 Agda Helin as 	Fru Pettersson 
 Mary Hjelte as Axelssons syster 
 Sven Holmberg as Larsson 
 Marianne Ljunggren as 	Medlem av revybaletten 
 John Melin as 	Viktor 
 Ingrid Olsson as 	Medlem av revybaletten 
 Ulla-Carin Rydén as 	Medlem av revybaletten 
 Maj-Britt Thörn as 	Medlem av revybaletten 
 Brita Ulfberg as 	Telefonist 
 Gunnel Wadner as 	Medlem av revybaletten 
 Alf Östlund as 	Axelsson

References

Bibliography 
 Qvist, Per Olov & von Bagh, Peter. Guide to the Cinema of Sweden and Finland. Greenwood Publishing Group, 2000.
Segrave, Kerry & Martin, Linda.  The Continental Actress: European Film Stars of the Postwar Era--biographies, Criticism, Filmographies, Bibliographies. McFarland, 1990.

External links 
 

1950 films
Swedish comedy films
1950 comedy films
1950s Swedish-language films
Films directed by Gösta Bernhard
1950s Swedish films